Marcelle Maurette (14 November 1903 – 24 October 1972) was a French playwright and screenwriter who is particularly well known for her play Anastasia (1952) which brought her international recognition, and inspired a film of the same name. It is not her only play centred on a woman with a tragic story. Many other works of hers feature historical or fictional heroines with dramatic lives. She was honoured with various awards and was a prominent French literary figure.

Early life 
Marcelle Marie Joséphine Maurette was born in Toulouse to General Georges Maurette and Marie-Louise Donbernard, on 14 November 1903. (See "Birthdate notes" section lower down page.) She was educated at St. Nom de Jésus, Toulouse, Cours Bouchut, Paris, and the 
Convent of the Filles de Notre Dame, Limoges. The painter Ingres was her great-great-uncle.

She began writing as a teenager: short stories, articles and poems, for which she won prizes.  In 1931 she married Count Yves de Becdelièvre who would later write a book about her: Marcelle Maurette, ma femme: journal de sa vie, 1903–1972. She was energetic and outgoing, enjoying socialising with her upper-class friends as much as her theatre and cinema work.

Theatre, cinema, and other writing 

In 1937 Maurette began to concentrate on writing plays, and in 1942 stopped working as a journalist and reviewer as she took up screenwriting too.

In the 1930s, when her theatrical work began to flourish, more French women than ever before were being recognised for their talent as dramatists and seeing their plays performed on the Parisian stage. Maurette was part of a contemporary move away from "literary" plays towards theatricality. Often she chose to portray "exceptional women" with "tragic lives". In this she was supported by the director Gaston Baty who rejected literary theatre while also avoiding naturalism, and staged four of her plays: Madame Capet, Manon Lescaut, Marie Stuart and Neiges. One critic believes that working with Baty helped Maurette find the right direction for her work.

The peak of her career came in the 1950s as a result of writing Anastasia. This play quickly moved beyond France to six other European countries and to the USA. An English translation/adaptation by Guy Bolton (1952) was staged in England by Mary Kerridge and John Counsell, then in 1953 shown on television where Vivien Leigh saw it and recommended it to her husband Laurence Olivier for a London production at the St. James's Theatre. It opened in New York on Broadway at the Lyceum in early 1955. In 1956 the play was presented at the Falmouth Playhouse in Massachusetts with the Mexican actress Dolores del Río and continued with a tour of seven other theaters throughout New England. Then, after bidding in competition with Warner and Metro-Goldwyn-Mayer, 20th Century Fox bought the rights for the 1956 film version of Anastasia with Ingrid Bergman and Yul Brynner, for "more than £20,000".

Other plays by Marcelle Maurette that have been shown in English-speaking countries are Madame Capet at the Cort Theatre, New York in 1938, Thérèse Raquin at the Edinburgh Royal Lyceum Theatre and the London Winter Garden Theatre in 1955, and Inquiry at Lisieux in the Dublin Theatre Festival 1963. She wrote screenplays for The Strange Madame X and for Sarajevo.

Her television plays also had some success, and she published a few books with historical themes.

Awards and memberships 
In 1950 she was made a chevalier of the Légion d'honneur and promoted to officier in 1964.  She was a commander of the Ordre des Arts et des Lettres. The Académie française awarded her two literary prizes: in 1952 the Prix Thiers and in 1962 the Prix Paul Flat. She was a member of various prestigious literary societies: the Société des auteurs et compositeurs dramatiques, the Société des gens de lettres, the Société des poètes français, and the Académie des Jeux Floraux de Toulouse. She was also on the Council of Administration of the ORTF, the French broadcasting organisation.

Legacy 
Marcelle Maurette died on 24 October 1972, and was buried at Guémené-Penfao, country home of the Becdelièvre family. She left behind about thirty works, in print and/or on film. The French National Library has a Maurette collection including scrapbooks with photographs and newspaper clippings for certain productions. A library at Guémené-Penfao has been named after her: the Médiathèque Marcelle Maurette.

Works

Plays 
1931: Printemps
1934: Celle qui revint
1937: Madame Capet
1939: Manon Lescaut, after l'Abbé Prévost
1941: Marie Stuart
1945: Le Roi Christine
1948: Thérèse Raquin, after Émile Zola 
1949: Neiges, co-writer Georgette Paul
1950: Anna Karénine, after Tolstoy
1954: L'Affaire Lafarge
1952: Anastasia
1962: La Nuit de feu
1966: Laurette or l'Amour voleur
1978: Rayons de gloire

Films 
1940: De Mayerling à Sarajevo directed by Max Ophüls 
1943: Mermoz directed by Louis Cuny
1946: Étrange Destin directed by Louis Cuny
1951: L'Étrange Madame X directed by Jean Grémillon
1953: Anastasia, for UK TV BBC Sunday Night Theatre
1956: Anastasia directed by Anatole Litvak
1961: Anna Karénine, for TV
1961: Le Procès de Sainte-Thérèse de l'enfant Jésus, for TV 
1964: La Nuit de feu, for TV
1967: L'Affaire Lourdes for TV
1967: Il processo di Santa Teresa del bambino Gesù, for Italian TV
1970: Thérèse d'Avila for TV
1970: La Possédée, for TV
1972: L'Image, for TV
1973: Laurette or l'Amour voleur, for TV
1997: Anastasia directed by Don Bluth and Gary Goldman, after Maurette's play

Books 
1939: La Vraie Dame aux Camélias ou l'Amoureuse sans amour, pub.  Michel Albin
1951: La Vie Privée de Madame de Pompadour, pub. Hachette
1963: Le Procès de Sainte Thérèse de l'Enfant Jésus, pub.  Cerf
1967: Guillaume le conquérant, la vie quotidienne des médecins au temps de Molière la révolution française, co-author, pub. le Cercle Historia (Sceaux)

Birthdate notes 
Two different birth years, 1903 and 1909, are given by people writing about Maurette.

14 November 1903 
 Her husband's book about her, written after her death, gives the 1903 birthdate in its title: Marcelle Maurette, ma femme: journal de sa vie, 1903-1972.
 The French National Library gives her dates as 1903 – 1972, as do other academic libraries. 
 14 November 1903 is the date given an article by a member of the Becdelièvre family.
 Mademoiselle Marcelle Maurette is mentioned, with her parents, in a Toulouse newspaper announcement about a church service in May 1909, so six months before any possible 1909 November birthday.

14 November 1909 
 There are several images of official-looking documents, copies of birth and marriage certificates etc., giving her birth year as 1909, on the website of the French Ministry of Culture.
 1909 is found in some directories of the "Who's Who" kind, and in other reference books.

References 

1903 births
1972 deaths
20th-century French dramatists and playwrights
Commandeurs of the Ordre des Arts et des Lettres
French women dramatists and playwrights
French women screenwriters
20th-century French screenwriters
Officiers of the Légion d'honneur
Writers from Toulouse
20th-century French women writers